Sandra Gardebring Ogren (June 14, 1947 – July 20, 2010) was an associate justice of the Minnesota Supreme Court appointed by Governor Rudy Perpich in 1991. She also served as Vice President for Institutional Relations at the University of Minnesota, and Vice President for Advancement at California Polytechnic State University following her resignation from the Minnesota Supreme Court in 1998. Born in Bismarck, North Dakota, Gardebring graduated from Luther College and the University of Minnesota Law School in 1973 and died in California. She also served on the Minnesota Court of Appeals 1989 to 1991. Gardebring was married to Paul Anders Ogren, who served in the Minnesota Legislature, with two stepchildren.

References 

1947 births
2010 deaths
Politicians from Bismarck, North Dakota
Luther College (Iowa) alumni
University of Minnesota Law School alumni
Minnesota Court of Appeals judges
Justices of the Minnesota Supreme Court
Minnesota lawyers
Spouses of Minnesota politicians
20th-century American judges
20th-century American lawyers
20th-century American women judges